Arina Rodionova and Yanina Wickmayer were the defending champions but they chose not to participate.

Miriam Kolodziejová and Markéta Vondroušová won the title, defeating Jessika Ponchet and Renata Voráčová in the final, 7–6(7–4), 6–2. This was Kolodziejová and Vondroušová's second consecutive title, following their title in Poitiers, where they defeated Ponchet and Voráčová to win the title.

Seeds

Draw

Draw

References

External Links
Main Draw

GB Pro-Series Shrewsbury - Doubles